Stephen McLeod Mailer (born March 10, 1966) is an American stage and screen actor. His credits include appearances in films like Cry-Baby, Baby Mama, and Another Woman and the television shows Gilmore Girls, Law & Order: Special Victims Unit, and A League of Their Own.

Mailer was born in New York City, New York, the son of novelist Norman Mailer and stage actress Beverly Bentley. He was married to fashion designer and film director Visnja Rodic Clayton then to producer Lindsay Marx. He was married to Elizabeth Rainer in 2010 and he has two children, Cal and Teddy.

References

External links

1966 births
American male film actors
American male stage actors
American male television actors
American people of South African-Jewish descent
Living people